John Beasley may refer to:

John Beasley (actor) (born 1943), American actor
John Beasley (basketball) (born 1944), American basketball player
 John R. Beasley (1900–1978), American football player
John Beasley (American football) (born 1945), American football player
John Beasley (musician) (born 1960), American keyboardist
John Beasley (cyclist) (1930–2017), Australian Tour de France cyclist
 John Albert Beasley, (1895–1949), an Australian politician

See also
Beasley (disambiguation), for other persons with the Beasley surname